"Farewell My Summer Love" is a song recorded by Michael Jackson in 1973. Written by Keni St. Lewis, it was later released in 1984 as a single from the compilation album of the same name due to the commercial interest that generated from the sales of Jackson's hit 1982 album Thriller.

It hit No. 7 on the UK Singles Chart and was a Top 40 Pop and R&B and Top 20 Adult Contemporary hit in the U.S.

Reception
Cash Box said that "all the vibrancy of the now legendary Jackson vocal style is present on this single."

Charts

Year-end charts

References

1973 songs
1984 singles
Michael Jackson songs
Motown singles
Songs written by Keni St. Lewis